Charles Robert Wolle (October 16, 1935 – December 6, 2022) was a United States district judge of the United States District Court for the Southern District of Iowa and a justice of the Iowa Supreme Court.

Education

Born in Sioux City, Iowa, Wolle received a Bachelor of Arts from Harvard College in 1959, and a Juris Doctor from the University of Iowa College of Law in 1961. His brother, William D. Wolle, served as the American ambassador to Bahrain, Oman, and the United Arab Emirates.

Legal and state judicial career 
Wolle was in private practice in Sioux City from 1961 to 1980, practicing at Shull, Marshall, Mayne, Marks & Vizintos, where his mentor was future congressman Wiley Mayne. He practiced civil litigation and labor law. He also served as a Reserve Sergeant in the United States Army from 1961 to 1967.

He was a judge of the Iowa District Court for the Third Judicial District, from 1981 to 1983, nominated by Robert D. Ray. He became a justice of the Iowa Supreme Court on March 11, 1983, serving until August 12, 1987. During that time, he chaired the committee that drafted the Iowa Rules of Evidence. He also became a member of the faculty of the National Judicial College in 1983.

Federal judicial service

On July 1, 1987, Wolle was nominated by President Ronald Reagan to a seat on the United States District Court for the Southern District of Iowa that was vacated when Judge William Corwin Stuart assumed senior status. Wolle was nominated on the recommendation of Chuck Grassley. Wolle was confirmed by the United States Senate on August 5, 1987, and received his commission on August 6, 1987. He served as Chief Judge of the Southern District from 1992 to 2001. Wolle assumed senior status on October 16, 2001 and retired from active service on December 2, 2021.

Wolle also regularly sat with the United States District Court for the Eastern District of New York. Wolle would split time between Douglas County, Nevada and Iowa and sat with the United States District Court for the District of Nevada and the United States Court of Appeals for the Ninth Circuit. As a judge, Wolle was known for emphasizing terse and concise judicial opinions. Wolle died on December 6, 2022.

References

Sources
 
 

1935 births
2022 deaths
20th-century American judges
21st-century American judges
Harvard College alumni
Iowa state court judges
Judges of the United States District Court for the Southern District of Iowa
Justices of the Iowa Supreme Court
People from Sioux City, Iowa
United States Army soldiers
United States district court judges appointed by Ronald Reagan
University of Iowa College of Law alumni